The canton of Pays de Serres Sud-Quercy is an administrative division of the Tarn-et-Garonne department, in southern France. It was created at the French canton reorganisation which came into effect in March 2015. Its seat is in Lafrançaise.

It consists of the following communes:

Belvèze 
Bouloc-en-Quercy
Cazes-Mondenard
Durfort-Lacapelette
Fauroux
Labarthe
Lacour
Lafrançaise
Lauzerte
Miramont-de-Quercy
Montagudet
Montaigu-de-Quercy
Montbarla
Puycornet
Roquecor
Saint-Amans-de-Pellagal
Saint-Amans-du-Pech 
Saint-Beauzeil
Sainte-Juliette
Sauveterre
Touffailles
Tréjouls
Valeilles
Vazerac

References

Cantons of Tarn-et-Garonne